Robert James Anderson can refer to:
Bob Anderson (fencer) (1922–2012), born Robert James Gilbert Anderson, English Olympic fencer
Bobby Anderson (actor) (1933–2006), American actor
Robert Anderson (murderer) (1966–2006), American murderer